Roman Baranov may refer to:

Roman Baranov (ice hockey) (born 1973), Soviet and Russian ice hockey player
Roman Baranov (football) (born 1976), Russian football player